VALO-CD, a distribution of open-source software on a CD for Microsoft Windows, aims to spread knowledge and the use of open-source software.

VALO-CD originates from Finland, and was originally available only in Finnish. Since version 7, an international version of VALO-CD has also been available in English.

The acronym VALO means "Free/Libre Open-Source Software" in Finnish.  is also a Finnish word that means "light". Therefore the name of the project has a connotation of bringing enlightenment. The Finnish version of VALO-CD had the special goal of concentrating on completely localized open-source software.

The project started in 2008, and aims to support technological and economic development in Finland.

Contents
Version 8 of VALO-CD includes the following software:
Writing and drawing: Dia, GIMP, Inkscape, LibreOffice, and Scribus.
Internet: Firefox, Thunderbird, Pidgin, Vuze, and WinSCP.
Recreation: Stellarium, and Tux Paint.
Multimedia: Audacity, MuseScore and VLC media player.
Tools: 7-Zip, Evince, InfraRecorder, KeePass, Notepad++, PDFCreator, and TrueCrypt.
Guides: Various user guides by FLOSS Manuals.

See also
OpenCD
OpenDisc
LoLiWin

References

External links

Free software distributions
Projects established in 2008
2008 establishments in Finland